"Brian the Bachelor" is the seventh episode from the fourth season of Family Guy. It originally broadcast on June 26, 2005 and was written by Mark Hentemann and directed by Dan Povenmire. The episode sees Brian becoming a contestant on The Bachelorette and falling in love with the bachelorette, only to be let down by her ignoring him off–camera. Meanwhile, Chris discovers his pimple, "Doug", can talk, and the pair cause mischief across the city. Overall, the episode was received with positive comments by critics and news sources.

Plot
Peter, Joe and Quagmire drag Cleveland to a bar to get him to meet some women, as he's still reeling from him and Loretta getting a divorce. It doesn't work so well, so when The Bachelorette comes to Quahog, Peter takes Cleveland to audition for the show. Cleveland gets nervous at the audition and in an effort to calm him down, Peter removes Cleveland's clothes and then his own. The producers see this and later on, Brian goes to them and explains that Peter was simply trying to help Cleveland and goes on to explain how Cleveland's been kind of lonely ever since he and his wife got divorced and figures that he's just confused about what he really wants in a relationship.

After meeting Brian, they recruit him to be a contestant. Brian's unsure about this and tries convincing them to recruit Cleveland, but he ultimately decides to join the show, primarily for the free food and drinks (especially the martinis), but ends up falling in love with the reality starlet, Brooke Roberts. Quagmire and Brian are the final two contestants on The Bachelorette. Brooke's visits to the Griffin house is catastrophic, but Brooke admits that it wasn't nearly as bad as the dinner she had with Quagmire and his mom. Brian wins her heart and the final rose, but when the cameras are turned off, Brooke wishes Brian good luck and that it was nice "working with him", revealing the show really is scripted, as Brian initially thought. Brian quickly becomes obsessed with Brooke and leaves several messages on her answering machine, even though she never gets back to him. Brooke gets angry at Brian for stalking her and throws her telephone at him when he attempts to serenade her outside her apartment. In the end, Brian feels upset about becoming the very thing he mocked before.

Meanwhile, Chris has a pimple on his face which he names "Doug". Lois worries about Chris, as Doug, who can talk, tells Chris to make some mischief. He goes to the Swansons' house and sets a bag of feces on fire on their porch, and writes “That’s enough, John Mayer” in spraypaint on the wall of the Quahog Mini-Mart. Lois sees Chris sneaking back into his room and is going to punish him but Chris tells her that Doug said he does not have to listen to her. This outrages Lois, deciding to go to Goldman's Pharmacy the next day and get some astringent to get rid of Doug. However, the next day, as Peter and Lois head to Goldman's, they realize there has been a break-in, and someone has destroyed Mort's entire stock of acne medication. That night, when Brooke comes over for dinner to meet Brian's family, Doug tells Chris to lift up Brooke's shirt, while Stewie asks how long Brooke has been a hooker. He does this, shocking and offending the family. Joe comes in, saying he has proof that it was Chris who vandalized, broke into Goldman's Pharmacy and stole Mort's acne medication. Chris decides he no longer wants to listen to Doug after he made his mom cry, but Doug says he could make Chris punch himself, or even worse, shoot him in the brain. Chris finally winds up at the dermatology clinic, and a struggle ensues as Doug tries to shoot him in the brain, but Chris manages to overpower him and use cortisone on Doug, finally taking him out.

Production

When this episode was being produced, The Bachelorette was a bigger and more prolific program than when this episode was originally broadcast. In addition, ABC was not doing very well at the time of this episode's production. The production staff encountered some trouble when deciding what Peter would be doing in the lobby with Cleveland during his Bachelorette audition; although the series could never come up with ideas they deemed to be suitable, they intended for Peter to put his buttocks in an aquarium tank in order to embarrass Cleveland and make him want to leave. This scene was not used, and the production staff used a scene of Peter putting his naked buttocks on Cleveland's naked buttocks; they also shortened this more detailed version and used the less-detailed current version.

During Cleveland's audition for The Bachelorette, an unused scene was created that showed both Peter and Cleveland naked, with Peter sitting on top of Cleveland and bouncing up and down, as if he and Cleveland were engaging in anal sex, but broadcasting standards prohibited the scene. Family Guy creator Seth MacFarlane comments in the DVD commentary that Walter Murphy, who composes much of the music for Family Guy, goes back and forth from standard Family Guy music to Bachelorette-style music during the episode. During the sequence where Brian and Brooke are talking in the barn, originally, the two horses in the background were intended to begin mating, but the sketch was never used. Nancy Cartwright, voice actor of Bart Simpson on The Simpsons, and Michael Bell, voice actor of Chaz Finster on Rugrats, provided their voices for the Snorks reference. The name of Quagmire's cat was originally "Pussy", but broadcasting standards objected. The episode was originally to feature a sequence showing Chris breaking entry into Goldman's Pharmacy in order to destroy the acne medication wearing a Balaclava, but the scene was never shown. The promo features Quagmire in a limo finding the girl of his dreams, but the scene was also cut.

Cultural references
According to the commentary from the DVD, Chris' talking pimple is a reference to Little Shop of Horrors. Chris shown waving his shirt above his head and being watched by Herbert through the window is a reference to 1978 comedy film National Lampoon's Animal House. He-Man from the Masters of the Universe media franchise is shown at the ranch during Brian's time on The Bachelorette. Chris mentions The Snorks to his zit in the scene were he spaypaints the mini mart. The sequence of Peter and Lois at Mort Goldman's pharmacy after the store vandalism is a reference to Fast Times at Ridgemont High, with Jeff Spicoli coming out of the restroom. Brian's phone call to Brooke after she selects him as a final contestant makes references to the Billy Vera song At This Moment. Disney CEO Michael Eisner is featured after Brooke reveals that "it's just TV". He comes out to give Brian a "consolation prize", which turns out to be a bill for the Bachelorette mansion.

Reception
As the most-watched Fox program that night, this episode had an audience of 7.29 million.

In a positive review of the episode in Family Guy, Volume 3, Dan MacIntosh of PopMatters praised the performance of Chris: "Chris' best scenes occur during "Brian The Bachelor", where he is shown developing an unlikely friendship with one of his facial zits."

By contrast, Family Guy, Volume 3, included a negative review by Francis Rizzo III (aka Turdboy) of DVD Talk: "Among the more frustrating trends in the series is its willingness to stretch an unfunny joke to its very limits. When Stewie berated Brian for not finishing his novel for nearly two minutes, not once, but twice, in "Brian the Bachelor", it tested my patience severely, and didn't even make me smile."

References

External links

 

Family Guy (season 4) episodes
2005 American television episodes